The SGB Championship 2021 was the second tier division, called the SGB Championship, of the British speedway championship in 2021. 

Changes from the last edition of the Championship (held in 2019) were the addition of three teams and the loss of two teams. The 2019 Premiership club Poole Pirates, were the biggest profile club to join the league after dropping down from the highest league. Also the Kent Kings and Plymouth Gladiators both joined the league from the National Development League. Sheffield Tigers left the league to move up to the highest division and Somerset Rebels withdrew from the league altogether.

The league started on 21 May with twelve teams participating and race meetings were covered by Eurosport. Poole Pirates finished top of the regular season table and secured a place in the play off semi finals. Poole duly won their play off semi final against Leicester and would meet Glasgow in the final. Glasgow, who had finished second in the table, defeated Edinburgh in the other semi final despite being eliminated from the Knockout Cup the week before by their Scottish rivals. 

Poole became the champions after a 96–84 aggregate win over Glasgow in the play off final. They also sealed the double winning the division 2 Knockout Cup for the third time in their history.

Final Table

League scoring system
Home loss by any number of points = 0
Home draw = 1
Home win by any number of points = 3
Away loss by 7 points or more = 0
Away loss by 6 points or less = 1
Away draw = 2
Away win by between 1 and 6 points = 3
Away win by 7 points or more = 4

Play Offs

Home team scores are in bold
Overall aggregate scores are in red

Final
First Leg

Second Leg

Knockout Cup
The 2021 SGB Championship Knockout Cup will be the 53rd edition of the Knockout Cup for tier two teams.

Tournament

HOME TEAM SCORES ARE IN BOLD
OVERALL AGGREGATE SCORES ARE IN RED
TIE WINNERS ARE IN BOLD

Final

First Leg

Second Leg

Teams and final averages

Berwick Bandits
 7.36
 7.12
 6.92
 6.59
 6.49
 6.47
 4.50

Birmingham Brummies
 8.75
 8.19
 7.62
 6.35
 6.30
 6.00
 4.18

Edinburgh Monarchs
 9.95
 8.94
 8.83
 6.35
 4.18
 5.09
 3.89
 1.83
 1.25
 0.67

Glasgow Tigers
 9.44
 8.71
 8.24
 8.18
 7.11
 6.88
 6.82
 6.32
 5.02
 3.71

Kent Kings
 9.74
 9.60
 6.78
 6.00
 5.55
 4.30
 4.18
 3.40
 2.37

Leicester Lions
 9.13
 8.66
 8.54
 8.44
 5.95
 5.85
 5.00
 4.76
 3.09
 3.00

Newcastle Diamonds
 7.46
 6.59
 6.09
 6.07
 6.00
 5.81
 1.60
 0.46
 0.00

Plymouth Gladiators
 10.18
 9.21
 7.15
 6.16
 5.07
 4.71
 4.66
 2.57
 2.46
 0.00
 0.00

Poole Pirates
 9.73
 9.12
 8.71
 6.21
 6.09
 5.88
 5.53
 3.47

Redcar Bears
 9.23
 9.11
 8.34
 8.00
 5.14
 5.00
 4.83
 4.57
 0.67

Scunthorpe Scorpions
 8.00
 7.83
 7.57
 6.77
 6.71
 6.49
 6.46
 4.49

Eastbourne Eagles (withdrew)

See also
List of United Kingdom speedway league champions
Knockout Cup (speedway)

References

SGB Championship
SGB Championship
SGB Championship